Bronisław Dutka (born 15 August 1957 in Pisarzowa) is a Polish politician. He was elected to Sejm on 25 September 2005, getting 5,469 votes in 14 Nowy Sącz district as a candidate from the Polish People's Party list.

He was also a member of Sejm 1991-1993 and Sejm 2001-2005.

See also
Members of Polish Sejm 2005-2007

External links
Bronisław Dutka - parliamentary page - includes declarations of interest, voting record, and transcripts of speeches.

Members of the Polish Sejm 2005–2007
Members of the Polish Sejm 1991–1993
Members of the Polish Sejm 2001–2005
Polish People's Party politicians
1957 births
Living people
Members of the Polish Sejm 2007–2011